Curse of the Red River is the debut studio album of the Finnish progressive death metal band Barren Earth. It was released on March 31, 2010, through Peaceville Records. The album led the band to receive the title of "Newcomer of the year" in 2011 at the Finnish Metal Awards, and "Best debut album" at the Metal Storm Awards in 2010.

Track listing

Credits

Band members 
 Mikko Kotamäki – lead vocals
 Olli-Pekka Laine – bass, backing vocals
 Kasper Mårtenson – keyboards, backing vocals
 Janne Perttilä – guitar, backing vocals
 Marko Tarvonen – drums
 Sami Yli-Sirniö – guitar, backing vocals

Production 
 Recorded and produced by Jukka Varmo and Barren Earth at Seawolf Studios and Jive Studios.

2010 albums
Barren Earth albums